Dillsboro is the name of two places in the United States:

 Dillsboro, Indiana
 Dillsboro, North Carolina